'''Gajapati Palace located at Paralakhemundi, of Gajapati district, Odisha, is the fort of Gajapati rulers where they used to stay. Nowadays the property is under the protection of Indian National Trust for Art and Cultural Heritage (INTACH). The palace is one of the rich architectural and cultural heritage of India. This palace was built for a purpose of permanent residential abode for the Gajapati Rulers of Paralakhemundi Estate belonging to the Eastern Ganga dynasty.

History
The palace was built by Maharaja Krushna Chandra Gajapati, the Gajapati ruler of that time. It is believed that the Paralakhemundi ruler started building the palace to enhance the beauty of the state. The concept of building the sight was finalized on 20 May 1835. As regards its historical importance, the seeds of a separate statehood for the Odia-speaking people were germinated in the Gajapati Palace precincts.

Architecture
The palace is known for its rich culture among the world heritages. British Architect, Robert Fellows Chisholm was responsible for design and construction of this royal fort. The fort is influenced by IndoSaracenic style combined with Byzantine and European architectural features. This palace is a 3-storey structure which has a secret hall and a subversive passageway that links to the chief citadel of the Maharaja. The palace includes an underground floor connecting it with the main palace of the Maharaja. It is believed that this secret passage was used by the royal family to hide during attacks from enemies.

One can easily notice eye-catching works of art on the walls of the fort (Brundaban palace). A stunning wood let is also situated close to Brundaban Palace. While entering into the Singhadwar (the main gate)  two reclining lions statues are seen on both sides over two raised platforms. A huge eye caching decorative iron gate stands anchored in between two round shaped tall minarets known as Gombuja (ଗମ୍ବୁଜ).A large mounted metal bell is situated at the main entrance, to be struck manually by a heavy wooden mallet for indicating accurate hourly time to the Palace and the general public of the town.

The gilt decorated walls and intricate wooden trellis-worked Durbar Hall is the main attraction of the palace. It is an excellent piece of art to experience. Durbar Hall is located in the middle of the pPalace and consists of Raja Mahal and Rani Mahal (the two main wings of the palace). The construction is so symmetrical that if one stands on the centre line of the place and makes comparison of both the wings, it is found that one half appears to be exactly the mirror image of the other half.

One other must visit place in the fort is the Gantaghar (strong-room). It is simultaneously used as an armoury room.

Location
Gajapati palace of paralakhemundi located in Paralakhemundi, Gajapati district. Gajapati district in Odisha is nearly 237 km from Bhubaneswar.

References

Gajapati district
Palaces in Odisha